Ōtaki Forks is a rural locality in the Kapiti Coast District of the Wellington Region of New Zealand's North Island.  It is located at the confluence of the Ōtaki River with its tributaries Waiotauru River and Waitatapia River. It is 18 km southeast of Ōtaki by road. It is the major entrance to the Tararua Forest Park from the west.

Seed & O'Brien's steam-powered sawmill at Sheridan Creek, which operated from 1930 to 1938, has been partially restored. It was closed by a flood which destroyed bridges.

Demographics
The statistical area of Ōtaki Forks, which also includes Hautere, covers ,.

Ōtaki Forks had a population of 777 at the 2018 New Zealand census, an increase of 60 people (8.4%) since the 2013 census, and an increase of 117 people (17.7%) since the 2006 census. There were 297 households. There were 393 males and 384 females, giving a sex ratio of 1.02 males per female. The median age was 50 years (compared with 37.4 years nationally), with 123 people (15.8%) aged under 15 years, 102 (13.1%) aged 15 to 29, 381 (49.0%) aged 30 to 64, and 171 (22.0%) aged 65 or older.

Ethnicities were 91.1% European/Pākehā, 8.5% Māori, 1.5% Pacific peoples, 1.9% Asian, and 4.6% other ethnicities (totals add to more than 100% since people could identify with multiple ethnicities).

The proportion of people born overseas was 21.6%, compared with 27.1% nationally.

Although some people objected to giving their religion, 55.6% had no religion, 33.6% were Christian, 1.2% were Buddhist and 1.9% had other religions.

Of those at least 15 years old, 195 (29.8%) people had a bachelor or higher degree, and 78 (11.9%) people had no formal qualifications. The median income was $34,500, compared with $31,800 nationally. The employment status of those at least 15 was that 315 (48.2%) people were employed full-time, 126 (19.3%) were part-time, and 12 (1.8%) were unemployed.

References

External links

Populated places in the Wellington Region
Kapiti Coast District